This article is a list of episodes from the television show Saber Rider and the Star Sheriffs in order by production number.

The English language rights to the series was purchased by World Events Productions (WEP) in 1986. WEP reorganized and rewrote the series, incorporating the original episodes and creating six new ones, before releasing it under the name Saber Rider and the Star Sheriffs. The writer, Marc Handler, was also behind Voltron: Defender of the Universe.

Episodes
The series premiered in the United States in 1987 and had a run of 52 episodes (46 of 51 original episodes plus 6 extra episodes).

"Five Lost Episodes" (no US release) 
The entire series (52 episodes of Saber Rider + 5 "Lost Episodes") has been released in German by Anime House on 8 + 2 DVDs.

External links 
Saber Rider und die Starsheriffs (German)

Lists of American children's animated television series episodes
Lists of anime episodes
Lists of science fiction television series episodes